Ralph Tyler may refer to:

 Ralph W. Tyler (1902–1994), American educator
 Ralph Waldo Tyler (1860–1921), African-American journalist